GYSO may refer to:
 Georgia Youth Symphony Orchestra
 Greek Youth Symphony Orchestra
 Guangzhou Symphony Youth Orchestra
 Guiyang Symphony Orchestra